The 2014–15 Lietuvos krepšinio lyga was the 22nd season of the top-tier level professional basketball league of Lithuania, the Lietuvos krepšinio lyga (LKL). The season started in October 2014, and finished in June 2015.

Žalgiris won its 17th title, the fifth in a row.

Competition format

Regular season 
During the regular season, all teams played 40 games.

Playoff round 
The top eight teams in the regular season round joined the playoffs in the quarterfinals, that were played in a best-of-three games format. The semifinals were also played in this format.

The final round was played between the two winners of the semifinals. The final series for the first place was played in a best-of-seven format, while the series for the third place was played in a best-of-five format.

League table

Results

Playoffs

Awards

Players of the week

Playoff MVPs

Players of the month 
 October:  Gediminas Orelikas (Lietuvos rytas)
 November:  Rashaun Broadus (Juventus)
 December:  Jonathan Lee (Šiauliai)
 January:  Alex Oriakhi (Pieno žvaigždės)
 February:  Antanas Kavaliauskas (Lietuvos rytas)
 March:  Rokas Giedraitis (Šiauliai)
 April:  Gytis Sirutavičius (Pieno žvaigždės)

Statistics 

Points

Rebounds

Assists

References

External links
 LKL website

 
Lietuvos krepšinio lyga seasons
Lithuanian
LKL